County Leitrim was a constituency represented in the Irish House of Commons until its abolition on 1 January 1801

County constituency
County Leitrim was represented by two MPs in the Irish House of Commons. It continued to be represented by two MPs in the United Kingdom House of Commons after 1801.

Members of Parliament
1613–1615 William Reynolds and Gerald Nugent
1634–1635 Charles Reynolds and __ Crofton
1639–1649 Humphrey Reynolds and Sir Charles Coote
1661–1666 Sir Oliver St George, 1st Baronet (sat for Galway and replaced by Sir George St George) and Robert Parke

1689–1801

See also
List of Irish constituencies

References

Constituencies of the Parliament of Ireland (pre-1801)
Historic constituencies in County Leitrim
1800 disestablishments in Ireland
Constituencies disestablished in 1800